Collonges-sous-Salève (literally Collonges under Salève), popularly known as Collonges, is a commune in the Haute-Savoie department in the Auvergne-Rhône-Alpes region in Eastern France. It is located on the Swiss border, between Geneva to the north and Mont Salève to the south, after which it is named. In 2018, Collonges-sous-Salève had a population of 3,952.

History
The name of Collonges (from the Latin colonica) designates a colony of farmers situated on land granted, along with certain liberties, by the land owner. The town dates from the 4th or 5th century. The modern commune has its roots in the Ancien Régime, arising out of a parish whose existence is recorded from the 12th century.

Italian composer Giuseppe Verdi (1813–1901) and singer Giuseppina Strepponi (1815–1897) were married in secret in the parish church of Collonges-sous-Salève, which then laid in the territory of the Kingdom of Piedmont. Collonges-sous-Salève is also the town of origin of the ancestors of French composer Maurice Ravel (1875–1937).

Although the town, as well as Haute Savoie generally, is traditionally Catholic, Collonges-sous-Salève is the location of Adventist University of France – Collonges and Maurice-Tièche comprehensive school, both owned by the Seventh-day Adventist church.

See also
Communes of the Haute-Savoie department

References

Communes of Haute-Savoie